Latrar Air Station (ADC/NATO ID: H-4), also known as Straumnes Air Station, is a former United States Air Force General Surveillance Radar station, located at the top of Mount Straumnes and in the bay of Aðalvík, Hornstrandir. The site was operated by the 934th Aircraft Control and Warning (later Air Defense, Later Air Control) Squadron, and was equipped with AN/FPS-3, AN/FPS-8 and AN/FPS-4 radars.

History
Construction of the air station started in 1953 in and the started operations in 1956. After only being in operation for four years, a decision was made to close the site in 1960 due to high operation costs and the last air force and civilian staff left the following year. In 1962, the Icelandic government took over ownership of the remaining buildings.

The Greenland, Iceland and United Kingdom air defense sector, better known as the GIUK gap, was routinely utilized by the Soviet Union's long-range heavy bombers and maritime reconnaissance platforms as a transit point towards the Atlantic Ocean. From bases located at Arkhangelsk and Murmansk, Soviet aircraft would stream down to the North Cape in Norway towards the Gap which was use as a doorway to the vast Atlantic. Most of the Soviet missions were destined to probe United States’ air defense along the North Atlantic and after 1960 in the Caribbean where Cuba, the USSR's most important satellite state outside continental Europe, was located. Such was the perceived threat from the Soviet incursions that it became a priority for NATO to demonstrate to that the strategic Giuk passage would be monitored at all times.

The mission of the station was to intercept and shadow all Soviet aircraft in transit in and from the Gap which passed through the detection range of its radars and pass the information to interceptor aircraft deployed at Keflavik Airfield.

After the site was closed, the facility was abandoned. The buildings are difficult to reach and remain in a deteriorating condition, most without windows, abandoned to the elements. In 1991, a major cleaning operation was performed at the site, involving the Icelandic Defence Force and local SAR units. The site remains a popular hiking destination.

See also
 United States general surveillance radar stations

References

Further reading
  A Handbook of Aerospace Defense Organization  1946–1980,  by Lloyd H. Cornett and Mildred W. Johnson, Office of History, Aerospace Defense Center, Peterson Air Force Base, Colorado
 Winkler, David F. (1997), Searching the skies: the legacy of the United States Cold War defense radar program. Prepared for United States Air Force Headquarters Air Combat Command.
 Information for Straumnes AS, IS

Radar stations of the United States Air Force in Iceland